Chopawamsic refers to several placenames in Northern Virginia, United States.

Chopawamsic (plantation) is an 18th-century plantation on Chopawamsic Creek
Chopawamsic Island is an island in the Potomac River
Chopawamsic Creek is a tributary stream of the Potomac River
Chopawamsic Recreational Demonstration Area is the former name for the Prince William Forest Park